The Swagman's Story is a 1914 short film directed by Raymond Longford. Although considered a lost film, it is likely that it was a low-budget support feature.

Plot
A swagman arrives on the scene of the breakdown of a motor car and tells the honeymooning drivers that he's never liked motor cars as they've never done him any good. He then goes on to explain why – ten years earlier he was living happily with his wife and pretty daughter (Lottie Lyell). Then the daughter marries a "swell city cove" and she becomes a member of the high society set, refusing to meet her unsophisticated mother. The mother is killed by a motor car and the father takes to drink and becomes a swagman.

Cast
Lottie Lyell
J Martin
C Stevenson
G Corti

References

External links
The Swagman's Story at IMDb

1914 films
Australian silent short films
Australian black-and-white films
Films directed by Raymond Longford
Lost Australian films